Lucidi Motors is an auto racing team based in Italy.

History

References

External links

Italian auto racing teams
Formula Renault Eurocup teams
British Formula Three teams
Italian Formula 3 teams

Auto racing teams established in 1991